The 63rd Armor Regiment is an armored regiment of the United States Army formed in 1942.

Lineage

Constituted 3 May 1942 in the Army of the United States as the 745th Tank Battalion

Activated 15 August 1942 at Camp Bowie, Texas

Reorganized and redesignated 1 September 1942 as the 745th Tank Battalion, Medium

Reorganized and redesignated 2 December 1943 as the 745th Tank Battalion

Inactivated 27 October 1945 at Camp Kilmer, New Jersey

Redesignated 14 September 1948 as the 63d Heavy Tank Battalion, allotted to the Regular Army, and assigned to the 1st Infantry Division

Activated 10 October 1948 in Germany

Reorganized and redesignated 10 October 1950 as the 63d Tank Battalion

Inactivated 15 February 1957 at Fort Riley, Kansas, and relieved from assignment to the 1st Infantry Division

Reorganized and redesignated 25 January 1963 as the 63d Armor, a parent regiment under the Combat Arms Regimental System

Withdrawn 16 September 1989 from the Combat Arms Regimental System and reorganized under the United States Army Regimental System

1st Battalion, 63rd Armor deployed in 1996 from Rose Barracks in Vilseck, Germany to Macedonia.  There, they participated in a United Nations mission (UNPREDEP) to monitor Macedonia's borders with Albania, Kosovo, and Serbia.  The Battalion returned to Germany in 1996.

2nd Battalion deployed from Rose Barracks in Vilseck, Germany to Iraq for Operation Iraqi Freedom II under the 1st Infantry Division from January 2004 till February 2005 at FOB Scunion near Baqubah, Iraq.

Campaign participation credit
World War II
Normandy (with arrowhead)
Northern France
Rhineland
Ardennes-Alsace
Central Europe
Modern
Kosovo (2003)
Operation Iraqi Freedom II (2004–5)

Decorations
Army Superior Unit Award, Streamer embroidered 1988
Army Superior Unit Award, Streamer embroidered 1990
Army Superior Unit Award, Streamer embroidered 1996–1997
French Croix de Guerre with Palm, World War II, Streamer embroidered NORMANDY
Belgian Fourragere 1940
Cited in the Order of the Day of the Belgian Army for action at Mons
Cited in the Order of the Day of the Belgian Army for action at Eupen-Malmedy

See also
 List of armored and cavalry regiments of the United States Army

References

http://www.riley.army.mil/News/Article-Display/Article/470330/tribute-paid-to-task-force-2-63-armor-soldier/

https://www.stripes.com/news/2-63-armor-regiment-soldiers-return-to-vilseck-from-iraq-1.29763#.WXKVNMYZOt8

https://www.un.org/Depts/DPKO/Missions/unpred_p.htm

063
Military units and formations established in 1942